Mäeküla is a village in Mulgi Parish in Viljandi County in southern Estonia. It borders the villages Hirmuküla, Sudiste, Ainja as well as Viljandi Parish.

Demographics
Population as of 1 January of each listed year.

References

Villages in Viljandi County